Trelles is one of seven parishes (administrative divisions) in the Coaña municipality, within the province and autonomous community of Asturias, in northern Spain. 

The population is 292 (INE 2007).

Villages
Bustabernego
Orbaelle (Eonavian: Orbaeye)
Pumarín
Sequeiro
Trelles
Villar
Vivedro

References

Parishes in Coaña